The soil carbon feedback concerns the releases of carbon from soils in response to global warming. This response under climate change is a positive climate feedback. There is approximately two to three times more carbon in global soils than the Earth's atmosphere, which makes understanding this feedback crucial to understand future climate change. An increased rate of soil respiration is the main cause of this feedback, where measurements imply that 4 °C of warming increases annual soil respiration by up to 37%.

Impact on climate change

An observation based study on future climate change, on the soil carbon feedback, conducted since 1991 in Harvard, suggests release of about 190 petagrams of soil carbon, the equivalent of the past two decades of greenhouse gas emissions from fossil fuel burning, until 2100 from the top 1-meter of Earth's soils, due to changes in microbial communities under elevated temperatures.

A 2018 study concludes, "Climate-driven losses of soil carbon are currently occurring across many ecosystems, with a detectable and sustained trend emerging at the global scale."

Permafrost
Thawing of permafrost (frozen ground), which is located in higher latitudes, the Arctic and sub-Arctic regions, suggest based on observational evidence a linear and chronic release of greenhouse gas emissions with ongoing climate change from these carbon dynamics.

Tipping point
A study published in 2011 identified a so-called compost-bomb instability, related to a tipping point with explosive soil carbon releases from peatlands. The authors noted that there is a unique stable soil carbon equilibrium for any fixed atmospheric temperature. Despite the prediction that the carbon balance of peatlands is going to shift from a sink to a source this century, peatland ecosystems are still omitted from the main Earth system models and integrated assessment models.

Uncertainties

Climate models do not account for effects of biochemical heat release associated with microbial decomposition. A limitation in our understanding of carbon cycling comes from the insufficient incorporation of soil animals, including insects and worms, and their interactions with microbial communities into global decomposition models.

See also
Ice–albedo feedback
Polar amplification
Biogeochemical cycle
Weathering
Soil regeneration

References

External links
Orbiting Carbon Observatory-2 (OCO-2)
Losses of soil carbon under global warming might equal U.S. emissions Yale University 2016
Microbial communities Latest Research and Reviews

Pedology
Climate change feedbacks
Effects of climate change